The Bayer designation ι Scorpii (Iota Scorpii) is shared by two stars in the constellation Scorpius:

 ι1 Scorpii
 ι2 Scorpii

They are separated by 0.50° in the sky.

Both of them were members of the asterism 尾 (Wěi), Tail, Tail mansion.

References

Scorpius (constellation)
Scorpii, Iota